Seraphim II Anina, (? – 7 December 1779) was the Ecumenical Patriarch of Constantinople from 1757 until 1761.

Life
Seraphim II was born in Delvinë, located in modern-day southern Albania in the late 17th century. He was an Albanian. Before he was elected as Patriarch of Constantinople on 22 July 1757 he was Metropolitan of Philippoupolis.

As Patriarch in 1759 he introduces the feast of Saint Andrew on 30 November, and in 1760 he gave the first permission to Cosmas of Aetolia to begin missionary tours in the villages of Thrace.

In 1759 he invited Eugenios Voulgaris to head the reforms in the patriarchal academy and during his tenure in the academy influenced by Seraphim's pro-Russian ideals Voulgaris contributed to the reapproachment of the Russian Empire with the Ecumenical Patriarchate of Constantinople. As a consequence Seraphim II was deposed on 26 March 1761 and exiled on Mount Athos, and he was replaced by the Ottoman authorities with Joannicius III. On Mount Athos, he rebuilt an old Monastic house, and dedicated it to the Saint Andrew. This house would eventually become the Skete of Saint Andrew.

On the field of politics, he supported the Russian Empire during the Russo-Turkish War of 1768-1774 and the establishment of an Orthodox pro-Russian state in the Balkans. In 1769 he urged the Greek population to rebel against the Turks. After the failure of the revolution, in 1776 he moved to Ukraine, where he died on 7 December 1779. He was buried in the Mhar Monastery.

Notes

17th-century births
1780s deaths
People from Delvinë
Albanian clergy
Eastern Orthodox Christians from Albania
18th-century Ecumenical Patriarchs of Constantinople
Albanian Eastern Orthodox priests